Ocean Diamond is a cruise ship operated by Quark Expeditions. She was previously named Song of Flower, Explorer Starship and Le Diamant.

In late 2011, Compagnie du Ponant sold the ship to investors who transferred the ship to Quark Expeditions. Quark has operated the ship as the Ocean Diamond since November 2012.

Expert in Residence program
Ocean Diamond has an Expert in Residence program, which enables scientists, polar researchers, historians and other experts to undertake field work from the ship. The experts include Jonathan Shackleton, Falcon Scott, and Sue Flood. Passengers may assist the experts in their work.

References

External links

Official Website

1973 ships
Ships built in Kristiansand
Ships of Compagnie du Ponant